Kapò is a 1960 Italian film about the Holocaust directed by Gillo Pontecorvo. It was nominated for the Academy Award as Best Foreign Language Film. It was an Italian-French co-production filmed in Yugoslavia.

Plot
Naive 14-year-old Edith (Susan Strasberg) and her Jewish parents are sent to a concentration camp, where the latter are killed. Sofia (Didi Perego), an older, political prisoner, and a kindly camp doctor save her from a similar fate by giving her a new, non-Jewish identity, that of the newly dead Nichole Niepas.

As time goes by, she becomes hardened to the brutal life. She first sells her body to a German guard in return for food. She becomes fond of another guard, Karl (Gianni Garko). The fraternization helps her become a kapo, one of those put in charge of the other prisoners. She thrives while the idealistic Sofia grows steadily weaker.

When she falls in love with Sascha (Laurent Terzieff), a Russian prisoner of war, Edith is persuaded to play a crucial role in a mass escape, turning off the power. Most of the would-be escapees are killed, but some get away. Edith is not one of them. As she lies dying, she tells Karl, "They betrayed us, Karl, they betrayed both of us." She dies saying the traditional Jewish prayer Shema Yisrael.

Cast
 Susan Strasberg as Edith, alias Nicole Niepas
 Laurent Terzieff as Sascha
 Emmanuelle Riva as Terese
 Didi Perego as Sofia
 Gianni Garko as Karl
 Annabella Besi as Carole
 Graziella Galvani as Isabelle
 Paola Pitagora as Georgette
 Eleonora Bellinzaghi
 Bruno Scipioni 
 Dragomir Felba as Salomon Lejtman
 Dušan Perković as Commandant

Critical reception
In their book Foreign Film Guide, authors Ronald Bergan and Robyn Karney wrote:What does one say about this effort? Pontecorvo has jam-packed his film with every kind of tear-jerking cliché on offer and entrusted the debasement and regeneration of his heroine to a sadly inept actress. The result is an overheated melodrama which does a grave disservice to the enormity of its subject, although the horrors of the camps are realistically portrayed".

In an article for The Wall Street Journal, philosopher Bernard-Henri Lévy wrote:Pontecorvo earned "the deepest contempt" of French director Jacques Rivette in an article in Cahiers du cinéma nearly 50 years ago for a scarcely more insistent shot in the 1959 film "Kapo." The shot was of the raised hand of actress Emmanuelle Riva, her character Terese electrocuted on the barbed wire of the concentration camp from which she was trying to escape. The criticism hung over Pontecorvo until his dying day. He was ostracized, almost cursed, for a shot, just one.
Lévy contrasted this reaction to one shot with what he asserted is the garish exploitation of Nazi history in Inglourious Basterds (2009) and Shutter Island (2010).

See also 
 List of Holocaust films
 List of submissions to the 33rd Academy Awards for Best Foreign Language Film
 List of Italian submissions for the Academy Award for Best Foreign Language Film

References

External links 
 
 
 
  Column « De l'Abjection » by Jacques Rivette (1961) devoted to Pontecorvo's Kapo, L'oBservatoire site.

1960 films
Holocaust films
Kapò
French black-and-white films
Italian black-and-white films
Yugoslav black-and-white films
Yugoslav war drama films
Films directed by Gillo Pontecorvo
Films scored by Carlo Rustichelli
Kapos (concentration camp)
Italian war drama films
Italian World War II films
Yugoslav World War II films